Taichung City electoral constituencies consist of 8 single-member constituencies, each represented by a member of the Republic of China Legislative Yuan.

Current constituencies

Some constituencies were renamed in 2010 as a result of the merger of Taichung County. Some adjustments were made in 2019.
Taichung City Constituency I: Dajia, Daan, Waipu, Qingshui, Wuqi
Taichung City Constituency II: Shalu, Longjing, Dadu, Wuri, Wufeng
Taichung City Constituency III: Houli, Shengang, Daya, Tanzi
Taichung City Constituency IV: Xitun, Nantun
Taichung City Constituency V: Beitun, North
Taichung City Constituency VI: South, East, Central, West
Taichung City Constituency VII: Taiping, Dali
Taichung City Constituency VIII: Fengyuan, Shigang, Dongshi, Xinshe, Heping

Legislators

Lu Shiow-yen resigned in 2018 to focus on her Taichung mayoral election campaign.

Lin Chia-lung resigned in 2014 to focus on his Taichung mayoral election campaign.

Huang Kuo-shu resigned from the DDP in October 2021 after reports surfaced that he worked as a Kuomintang informant in his 20s.

Election results

2019 By-election

2016

Notes

References

Constituencies in Taiwan
Government of Taichung